Narendra Bahadur Bumis a Nepalese politician. He was elected to the Pratinidhi Sabha in the 1999 election on behalf of the Nepali Congress. Bum was the NC candidate in the Baitadi-1 constituency for the 2008 Constituent Assembly election.

References

Living people
Nepali Congress politicians from Sudurpashchim Province
Year of birth missing (living people)
Place of birth missing (living people)
Nepal MPs 1999–2002